Tokosha Mountains is a  multi-peak massif located in the Alaska Range, in Denali National Park and Preserve, in Alaska, United States. Despite its relatively low elevation, it is notable for its Teton-esque granite spires which can seen from the George Parks Highway.

History

In the Denaʼina language, tokosha means "treeless" or "treeless area". The mountain was named in by 1906 by explorer Belmore Browne of the Cook Expedition which attempted to climb Denali. The first ascent of Grand Tokosha was made on March 3, 1975 by David Johnston and Brian Okonek.

See also
Mountain peaks of Alaska

References

Gallery

External links
 Weather forecast: Tokosha Mountains

Alaska Range
Mountains of Matanuska-Susitna Borough, Alaska
Mountains of Denali National Park and Preserve
Mountains of Alaska
Denaʼina